Paul Falk (born 17 December 1996) is a German actor, voice actor and musician.

Life and career
Falk was born in Düsseldorf, to Angelica and Dieter Falk. He has an older brother, Max.

Since the age of 8 he has recited various roles in several musicals for children such as Mose – ein echt cooler Retter and Joseph – ein echt cooler Träumer. He is currently the main character (narrator) in Die 10 Gebote (with Dieter Falk and Michael Kunze), which also contributed to the melody of a song.

He also works as a voice actor. He voiced the young king Macius in the film Der kleine König Macius – Der Film (2007), which was originally intended spokesman, and was therefore, in the category herausragende Nachwuchsleistung the Preis für Deutsche Synchron 2008. He also voiced the character in the second season of the television series of the same name. On 7 October 2007 he performed the Voice Control in the musical Starlight Express in Bochum.

Along with his brother Max and his father, representing the band Falk & Sons, he played in the tour Celebrate Bach. The self-titled album was released in November 2011 by the Universal Music Group Deutschland.

In June 2012, the film was presented at the Kleine Bites Film Festival in Shanghai. Paul plays his first starring role, along with Uwe Ochsenknecht and Ann-Kathrin Kramer.

Filmography

Awards and nominations

References

External links
 
  
 

1996 births
German male child actors
Living people
German male musical theatre actors
German male voice actors
German male film actors
German male television actors